In phonology, barytonesis, or  recessive accent, is the shift of accent from the last or following syllable to any non-final or preceding syllable of the stem, as in John Donne's poetic line: but éxtreme sense hath made them desperate, the Balto-Slavic Pedersen's law and Aeolic Greek barytonesis. The opposite, the accent shift to the last syllable is called oxytonesis.

References

External links
 

Sound laws
Figures of speech
Phonology
Stress (linguistics)